Capps, also known as Choctawhatchee, is an unincorporated community in Henry County, Alabama, United States.

History
Capps is named after Daniel W. Capps, the community's first postmaster. A post office operated under the name Capps from 1849 to 1972. Capps served as a shipping point for agricultural products between Abbeville and Headland.

References

Unincorporated communities in Henry County, Alabama
Unincorporated communities in Alabama